Ellipura is a proposed subclass containing the orders Protura and Collembola.

References 

Entognatha
Arthropod subclasses